The Estonian United Left Party is a political party in Estonia representing the Russian minority in Estonia. The party, founded in 2008, is the descendant of the Communist Party of Estonia, the former ruling party of Estonia during the Soviet occupation period.

Today, the party is a member of the Party of the European Left.

History 
On 28 June 2008, the Estonian Left Party (a party comprising most of the remnants of the post-1990 Communist Party of Estonia) and the Constitution Party (one of two parties representing the Russian minority in Estonia) merged to form the Estonian United Left Party (Eestimaa Ühendatud Vasakpartei). Despite the party's professed adherence to a left-wing direction, some observers and journalists have noted and claimed that the party is perceived to be more interested in catering to Russian minority politics and has been relatively marginal in Estonian politics. In particular, party chairman Mstislav Rusakov made a comment about the party's apparent obscurity for an interview for Eesti Rahvusringhääling: "The problem is to convey this information to people, because, as I already said, go out into the street, ask: "The United Left Party ...?", they will tell you: "What is this?". Meanwhile, in an opinion article for the online Russian-language edition of Postimees, Valery Saïkovski asserts that the party is only relevant for Russian nationalist purposes.

In 2018, there were posters in Tallinn allegedly from the EULP that endorsed Pavel Grudinin, the presidential candidate from the Communist Party of the Russian Federation running in the 2018 Russian presidential election. However, the party has denied that they are responsible for these posters, and the Russian Embassy in Estonia called them "low quality craft".

Election results

Parliamentary elections

European Parliament elections

Notes

References

External links 
Official website

2008 establishments in Estonia
Democratic socialist parties in Europe
Party of the European Left member parties
Political parties established in 2008
Russian political parties in Estonia
Socialist parties in Estonia